Rohini Kumar Chaudhuri (or Chaudhury, 2 April 1899 – 16 December 1955) was an Indian politician. He was a Member of Parliament, representing Gauhati, Assam in the Lok Sabha the lower house of India's Parliament as a member of the Indian National Congress. He was also a member of the Constituent Assembly of India.

Early life

Rohini Kumar Chaudhuri was born in Kamrup, Assam on 2 May 1889. Chaudhuri attended Government High Schools in Nowgong, Gauhati, Dhubri in Assam and went on to obtain degrees in Arts and Law from the Scottish Church College, Presidency College and Ripon College.  Later, he became a Senior Advocate in the Supreme Court of India.

He was deeply involved in Assamese politics, and became a member of the Assam legislature from 1927 to 1945.

Role in India’s Independence Movement

Chaudhuri was one of the leaders of the non-cooperation movement in Assam.

Contribution to Constitution Making

Chaudhuri was elected to the Constituent Assembly from Assam on a Congress party ticket.  In the Assembly, he has intervened on issues ranging from citizenship, discrimination and untouchability.

References

External links
Official biographical sketch in Parliament of India website

1899 births
1955 deaths
India MPs 1952–1957
Indian National Congress politicians
Lok Sabha members from Assam
Members of the Constituent Assembly of India
Indian National Congress politicians from Assam